Faiava Lasi is an islet of Nukufetau, Tuvalu, which is immediately to the south of Lafaga islet at the North East of Nukufetau atoll.

References

Islands of Tuvalu
Pacific islands claimed under the Guano Islands Act
Nukufetau